This is a list of episodes for the NBC television series Medic.

Series overview

Episodes

Season 1 (1954–55)

Season 2 (1955–56)

References

External links
 

Medic